Kaspy is a rural locality (a settlement) in Razdorsky Selsoviet, Kamyzyaksky District, Astrakhan Oblast, Russia. The population was 310 as of 2010. There are 3 streets.

Geography 
Kaspy is located 35 km southeast of Kamyzyak (the district's administrative centre) by road. Sizova Griva is the nearest rural locality.

References 

Rural localities in Kamyzyaksky District